The following is an alphabetical list of topics related to the British Overseas Territory of the Bermuda Islands.

0–9

 .bm–Internet country code top-level domain for Bermuda

A
 ACE Ltd.
 Americas
 North America
 Northern America
 North Atlantic Ocean
 Bermuda Islands
 Anglican Church of Bermuda
 Anglo-America
 Annie's Bay, Bermuda
 Anselm Genders
 Antonio Pierce
 Area code 441
 Arthur Heber Browne
 Ashley House (Paget Parish, Bermuda)
 Atlas of Bermuda
 Azeem Pitcher

B
 The Bank of Bermuda
 Bermuda Aquarium, Museum and Zoo
 Bermuda at the 1930 British Empire Games
 Bermuda at the 1976 Summer Olympics
 Bermuda at the 1988 Summer Olympics
 Bermuda at the 2000 Summer Olympics
 Bermuda at the 2004 Summer Olympics
 Bermuda at the 2006 Commonwealth Games
 Bermuda at the 2006 Winter Olympics
 Bermuda Biological Station for Research
 Bermuda Botanical Gardens
 Bermuda Broadcasting
 Bermuda Fitted Dinghy
 Bermuda Football Association
 Bermuda High School for Girls
 Bermuda Industrial Union
 Bermuda International Airport
 Bermuda Islands
 Bermuda Militia 1612-1687
 Bermuda Militia 1687-1813
 Bermuda Militia 1813
 Bermuda Militia Artillery
 Bermuda Militias 1612-1815
 Bermuda Monetary Authority
 Bermuda national football team
 Bermuda National Stadium
 Bermuda National Trust
 Bermuda petrel
 Bermuda Police Service
 Bermuda Public Services Association
 Bermuda Railway
 Bermuda Regiment
 Bermuda rig
 Bermuda rock skink
 Bermuda Sea Cadet Corps
 Bermuda sloop
 Bermuda Stock Exchange
 Bermuda Triangle
 Bermuda Volunteer Rifle Corps
 Bermuda
 Bermudian architecture
 Bermudian dollar
 Bermudian English
 Bermudian pound
 Boaz Island, Bermuda
 Brian Wellman
 British Overseas Territory of the Bermuda Islands

C
 Cahow
 Capital of Bermuda: Hamilton
 Caribbean Community (CARICOM)
 Castle Harbor, Bermuda
 Castle Island, Bermuda
 Categories:
 :Category:Bermuda
 :Category:Bermuda stubs
 :Category:Bermuda-related lists
 :Category:Bermudian culture
 :Category:Bermudian people
 :Category:Buildings and structures in Bermuda
 :Category:Communications in Bermuda
 :Category:Economy of Bermuda
 :Category:Education in Bermuda
 :Category:Environment of Bermuda
 :Category:Geography of Bermuda
 :Category:Government of Bermuda
 :Category:History of Bermuda
 :Category:Military of Bermuda
 :Category:Politics of Bermuda
 :Category:Science and technology in Bermuda
 :Category:Society of Bermuda
 :Category:Sport in Bermuda
 :Category:Transport in Bermuda
 commons:Category:Bermuda
 The Causeway, Bermuda
 Charles Elliot

 Christopher Charles Luxmoore
 Church Bay, Bermuda
 Clarence Hill (boxer)
 Clay Smith (cricketer)
 Clyde Best
 Coat of arms of Bermuda
 Collie budz aka Colin Harper
 Common ground dove
 Commonwealth of Nations
 Communications in Bermuda
 Coney Island, Bermuda
 Cooper's Island, Bermuda
 Crystal Cave, Bermuda
 Culture of Bermuda

D
 Dandy Town Hornets F.C.
 Daniel Morgan (cricketer)
 Darrell's Island, Bermuda
 David Bascome
 David Hemp
 Dean Minors
 Delyone Borden
 Demographics of Bermuda
 Dennis Archer (cricketer)
 Devil's Hole, Bermuda
 Devonshire Parish, Bermuda
 Dwayne Leverock

E
 Eastern bluebird
 Economy of Bermuda
 Edward Harris (archaeologist)
 Elbow Beach, Bermuda
 Elections in Bermuda
 English colonization of the Americas
 English language
 Eric Joseph Trapp
 Ewen Ratteray
 Earle E. Seaton

F

 The Fairmont Hamilton Princess
 Fernance Perry
 Ferry Reach, Bermuda
 Flag of Bermuda
 Flatt's Inlet, Bermuda
 Flatts Village, Bermuda
 Flora and fauna in Bermuda
 Foreign relations of Bermuda
 Francis Patton

G
 Geography of Bermuda
 George O'Brien (cricketer)
 George Somers
 Gibbs Hill Lighthouse
 Gina Swainson
 Glyn Gilbert
 Government House, Bermuda
 Governor of Bermuda
 Gray catbird
 Great kiskadee
 Great Sound, Bermuda
 Gunner Bay, Bermuda

H
 Hail to Bermuda
 Hamilton–Capital of Bermuda
 Hamilton Harbor, Bermuda
 Hamilton Parish, Bermuda
 Harrington Sound, Bermuda
 Hasan Durham
 Hawkins Island, Bermuda
 Heather Nova
 Hinson's Island, Bermuda
 History of Bermuda
 HMS Bermuda
 Horseshoe Bay, Bermuda
 House of Assembly of Bermuda
 HSBC
 Hurricane Dean (1989)
 Hurricane Debby (1982)
 Hurricane Emily (1987)
 Hurricane Fabian
 Hurricane Felix (1995)
 Hurricane Florence (2006)
 Hurricane Karen (2001)

I
 International Organization for Standardization (ISO)
 ISO 3166-1 alpha-2 country code for Bermuda: BM
 ISO 3166-1 alpha-3 country code for Bermuda: BMU
 Ireland Island, Bermuda
 Irving Romaine
 Islands of Bermuda

J
 Janeiro Tucker
 Jennifer M. Smith
 John Armstrong
 John Arthur Jagoe
 John Barry Nusum
 John Swan
 Johnny Barnes
 Juniperus bermudiana
Juniperus Capital

K
 Kenneth Amis
 Kevin Hurdle
 Khano Smith
 Kiskadee
 Kwame Tucker
 Kyle Lightbourne

L
 Law of Bermuda
 Lionel Cann
 Lists related to Bermuda:
 Islands of Bermuda
 List of Bermuda ODI cricketers
 List of Bermuda Triangle incidents
 List of Bermuda-related topics
 List of Bermudian first-class cricketers
 List of Bishops of Bermuda
 List of cities in Bermuda
 List of football clubs in Bermuda
 List of mammals of Bermuda
 List of NANP area codes
 List of political parties in Bermuda
 List of Premiers of Bermuda
 List of schools in Bermuda
 List of television stations in Bermuda
 Topic outline of Bermuda
 Little Sound, Bermuda
 Lois Browne-Evans
 London Company
 Long Island, Bermuda
 Longtail

M
 Mangrove Lake, Bermuda
 Marshall's Island, Bermuda
 Mary Prince
 Michael Douglas
 Military of Bermuda
 Mourning dove
 MS Frontier Reinsurance

N
 Naval Air Station Bermuda
 Nonsuch Island, Bermuda
 North America
 North Atlantic Ocean
 Northern America
 Northern cardinal
 Northern Hemisphere

O
 Ordnance Island, Bermuda

P
 Paget Island, Bermuda
 Paget Parish, Bermuda
 Parliament of Bermuda
 Pembroke Parish, Bermuda
 Peter Benchley
 Places of interest in Bermuda
 Politics of Bermuda
 Port Royal
 Progressive Labour Party (Bermuda)
 Public holidays in Bermuda

R
 RNAS Boaz Island
 Rebecca Middleton
 Robert Wright Stopford
 Royal Air Force, Bermuda, 1939-1945
 Royal Naval Dockyard, Bermuda
 Ryan Steede

S
 St. David's Head, Bermuda
 St. David's Island, Bermuda
 St. George's Harbor, Bermuda
 St. George's Island, Bermuda
 St. George's Parish, Bermuda
 St. George's, Bermuda
 Saleem Mukuddem
 Salt Kettle, Bermuda
 Saltus Grammar School
 Sandys Parish, Bermuda
 Sargasso Sea
 Scouting in Bermuda
 Sea Venture
 Senate of Bermuda
 Shaun Goater
 Sinky Bay
 Smith's Island, Bermuda
 Smith's Parish, Bermuda
 Somers Isles Company
 Somerset Bridge, Bermuda
 Somerset Island, Bermuda
 Somerset, Bermuda
 Southampton Parish, Bermuda
 Spanish Point, Bermuda
 Spittal Pond, Bermuda
 Steven Outerbridge
 Subdivisions of Bermuda

T
 Thomas Gates (governor)
 Thomas Leslie Outerbridge
 Thomas Norman Nisbett
 Tim Hemp
 Tobacco Bay, Bermuda
 Topic outline of Bermuda
 Transport in Bermuda
 Treadwell Gibbons
 Trott's Pond, Bermuda
 Troy Douglas
 Trunk Island, Bermuda
 Tucker's Town Peninsula, Bermuda
 Tucker's Town, Bermuda
 Tudor Hill Laboratory
 Tyler Butterfield

U
 United Bermuda Party
 United Kingdom of Great Britain and Northern Ireland
 USCG Air-Sea Rescue, at USAF Base, Kindley Field
 USCG Base, Whites Island, Bermuda. WWI
 USL Second Division
 USN NAS Bermuda, Kindley Field, 1970-1995
 USN NAS Bermuda/NAS Annex, Morgans Point, 1941-1995
 USN Submarine Base, Ordnance Island, Bermuda
 U.S. Naval Facility Bermuda

V
 Victoria Park, Hamilton
 VSB-TV

W
 Warwick Academy
 Warwick Parish, Bermuda
 White-eyed vireo
 White-tailed tropicbird
 
 Wikipedia:WikiProject Topic outline/Drafts/Topic outline of Bermuda
 William Alexander Scott
 William John Denbigh Down

Y
 Yellow-crowned night heron

Z
 ZBM-TV
 ZFB-TV

See also

 
 
 
 
 List of international rankings
 Lists of country-related topics
 Topic outline of Bermuda
 Topic outline of geography
 Topic outline of North America

References

External links
 

 
Bermuda